Frederick Pennington (7 March 1819 – 11 May 1914) was an English merchant and Liberal politician who sat in the House of Commons from 1874 to 1885.

Life
Pennington was the son of John Pennington, cotton spinner and merchant of Hindley, Lancashire and Elizabeth, daughter of John Hargreaves of Westhoughton. He was educated at Dr Formby's school at Southport and in Paris from 1830 to 1832. After many years as an East India merchant, he retired from business in 1865. He was a J.P. for Surrey.

Pennington was a member of the council of the Anti-Corn Law League which he supported generously. He was an advanced Liberal, part of the relatively radical Liberal group, championing free trade, the end to church-state mixed local administration and mass production. He stood for parliament unsuccessfully at West Surrey in 1868. At the 1874 general election he was elected Member of Parliament for Stockport. He held the seat, through an era of the same representation elections, until standing down for the 1885 election.

Pennington lived at Broome Hall, Holmwood on southern slopes of the Greensand Ridge, Surrey where the weekend gatherings included many eminent guests from the worlds of politics, art and literature. He died, 95, survived by his widow at his London home or rental, 17 Hyde Park Terrace.

Pennington married in 1854 Margaret Landell Sharpe, daughter of  John Sharpe, Vicar of Doncaster. She was heavily involved in the women's movement and a campaigner for emancipation and suffrage. One of Pennington's sisters married Thomas Thomasson.

References

External links

1819 births
1914 deaths
Liberal Party (UK) MPs for English constituencies
UK MPs 1874–1880
UK MPs 1880–1885
People from Holmwood
Members of the Parliament of the United Kingdom for Stockport